Eastbrookend Country Park is an 84-hectare park and Local Nature Reserve in Dagenham in the London Borough of Barking and Dagenham, in England. Together with the neighbouring Chase Nature Reserve it is also designated a Site of Metropolitan Importance for Nature Conservation.

The site was derelict land, which was turned into a park by large-scale earth-moving to create an undulating landscape with wild flower grassland mixes and over 50,000 small trees. It was opened in 1995. Facilities include a millennium centre and a fishing lake. it has a mixture of grazed wetland and dry habitats next to the River Rom. Dagenham Road goes through the park.

References

External links

Nature reserves in the London Borough of Barking and Dagenham
Local nature reserves in Greater London
Country parks in London